Doggy style is any sex position in which a person bends over, crouches on all fours, or lies on their stomach, for sexual activity.

Doggy style or doggystyle may also refer to:

 Doggystyle, the 1993 debut studio album from American rapper Snoop Dogg
 Snoop Dogg's Doggystyle, a mixed hardcore pornography and hip-hop music video featuring the music of rapper Snoop Dogg
 Doggy Style Records, an American record label founded by Snoop Dogg in 1995
 Doggy Style (band), a Punk Rock band from Placentia, California
 "Doggy Style", a song by Psychopomps from their 1993 album Pro-Death Ravers
 "Doggy Style", a song by Swiss band Krokus from their 1995 album To Rock or Not to Be

See also
 Dogging (sexual slang)